The Cambodian Liberty Party (CLP) is a Cambodian political party founded in November 2015 by former Cambodian People's Party lawmaker Chea Chamroeun. Prince Sisowath Chakrey Noukpol was chosen President of the party on May 4, 2016.

References

2015 establishments in Cambodia
Conservative parties in Cambodia
Liberal parties in Cambodia
Political parties established in 2015
Political parties in Cambodia
Republican parties in Cambodia